I Surrender Dear is a 1948 American musical film directed by Arthur Dreifuss and starring Gloria Jean.

It was the first of a series of films Jean made for producer Sam Katzman.

Cast
Gloria Jean as Patty Nelson, also known as Patty Hart
David Street as Al Tyler
Don McGuire as Tommy Tompkins
Alice Tyrrell as Trudy Clements
Robert Emmett Keane as Russ Nelson
Douglas Wood as R. H. Collins
Regina Wallace as Mrs. Nelson
Byron Foulger as George Rogers
 The Novelites
Jack Eigen as Himself
Dave Garroway as Himself
Peter Potter as Himself

Production
I Surrender Dear was originally the title of what became Glamour Girl (1948). The title was re-used here.

It was meant to be followed by a film called Sweetheart of the Blues which became Manhattan Angel. Dreifuss and Jean then made some films for Eagle Lion.

References

External links

Review of film at Variety

1948 films
American musical drama films
Columbia Pictures films
1940s musical drama films
American black-and-white films
1948 drama films
Films directed by Arthur Dreifuss
1940s American films